Tournado is the third video release by American rock band The All-American Rejects. It was recorded at the Roy Wilkins Auditorium in Saint Paul, Minnesota on December 16, 2006 during the band's Tournado tour for their second studio album, Move Along, and was released July 17, 2007. It also includes a behind-the-scenes tour documentary.

Concert setlist

Special features
Special features on the DVD include a 90-minute Tournado concert/documentary film. Two sound mixes are available on the DVD, with 5.1 Dolby Digital Surround as well as a stereo mix. There is also a photo gallery of the tour on the DVD, with the album cut of the song "Dance Inside" from Move Along played during the span of photos.

Chart history

References

External links
Tournado on Sanity.com.au
Interscope Records Release Database

The All-American Rejects video albums
2007 video albums
Live video albums
2007 live albums